Shannon Esra (née Esrechowitz; born 1 February 1984) is a South African actress and singer.

Early life

Early  life and career beginning

Esra had her first "taste" of acting at age 4, narrating a nursery school Purim concert. She later did impersonations of Elvis Presley at local talent contests.

Esra had her first professional acting at the age of 16, when she appeared in the film I Dreamed of Africa (starring Kim Basinger), playing a character named Siri. She later studied Dramatic Arts at the University of the Witwatersrand receiving her BA (Hons) Degree in 2003.

She won a Naledi Theatre Award for Best Performance by a Newcomer/Breakthrough (Female), in Dorothy Ann Gould's theatre production Japes for her portrayal of Neets. She also received a Fleur du Cap nomination for this role.

Other stage productions included the three-woman comedy Six Inches (2018) written and directed by Kristy Suttner, as well as the cabaret Homebound in 2004.

Career

Television appearance

Esra made history in Bollywood with her portrayal of Stephanie in the film Salaam-e-Ishq: A Tribute to Love by being one of the first Caucasian actresses in a lead role. Dying her hair blonde and speaking in an American accent, Esra' plays an American who travels to India to stop her boyfriend (played by Kushal Punjabi) from marrying. After reaching India, she met Raju, a taxi driver (played by Govinda) who comes to the assistance of her and she eventually falls in love with Raju.

In 2005 she guest-starred alongside Eric Stoltz, playing his estranged and embittered ex-wife, in the Sci Fi Channel's miniseries The Triangle.  She also played the romantic lead Katie in Darrell Roodt's film about rugby, Number 10.

In 2005 Esra played the lead role of Caz O’Donough, an undercover police officer, in the gritty South African psychological thriller / police drama Snitch.  Caz is a 20-year-old single mother, finding out that the father of her daughter, Lawrence Carter, is a member of a mafia-style crime family that her "tough cop" father Chisel, has been trying to bring down.

She currently appears in Tim Greene's multiple South African Film & Television Award-winning newsroom drama Hard Copy, as the ambitious investigative journalist Kim Smollen.  Kim is a Jewish girl in her mid-20s who started as the entertainment reporter at the hard edged newspaper The Bulletin.  In the third season Kim is given the opportunity for "serious" reporting, at the now re-invented sleazy tabloid The Bullet.

Filmography

Films

Television

Personal life

Esra lives in Sandton with her parents and younger brother. She is a "closet fan" of competitive ping-pong competitions.

References

External links
 
  Hollywood next for Shannon Esra?
 "Hard Copy" Page
  From Braamfontein to Bollywood and back

Living people
1984 births
Actresses from Johannesburg
People from Sandton
South African film actresses
South African television actresses
South African soap opera actresses
South African stage actresses
Actresses in Hindi cinema
South African expatriate actresses in India
Expatriate actresses in the United States
South African expatriates in the United States
White South African people
South African Jews
University of the Witwatersrand alumni
21st-century South African actresses
21st-century South African women singers